The Australian Long Track Championship is a Motorcycle speedway championship held annually in Australia to determine the Australian Long Track champion. The event is organised and sanctioned by Motorcycling Australia (MA). Where as motorcycle speedway takes place on tracks ranging from 250–400 metres in length, Long track racing generally takes place on 800 to 1000 metre long speedways.

Prior to 1947, the championship was known as the Australian 5 Mile Dirt Track Championship and was run from 1925-1927 with classes including 350cc, 500cc and Unlimited. The first championship was run on 11 April 1925 at Penrith in New South Wales and was won by Billy Conoulty.

The Australian Long Track Championship has run continuously since 1947 with a few exceptions. In recent years due to the lack of genuine Long track speedways in Australia, racing has generally taken place on ½ Mile or 1 Km long Harness Racing or Showground tracks in country towns.

Winners since 1947

See also

Motorsport in Australia
List of Australian motor racing series

References

External links
Long Track Honor Roll

Motorsport competitions in Australia
Speedway in Australia
Motorcycle racing series